Sex/Life is an American drama streaming television series created by Stacy Rukeyser for Netflix. The series is inspired by the novel 44 Chapters About 4 Men by BB Easton and it premiered on June 25, 2021. In September 2021, the series was renewed for a second season which was released on March 2, 2023.

Premise
Promotional materials described the show as what happens when "a suburban mother of two takes a fantasy-charged trip down memory lane that sets her very married present on a collision course with her wild-child past."

Cast and characters

Main

 Sarah Shahi as Billie Mann Connelly, a former Columbia University psychology PhD candidate, mother of two, and housewife in an affluent suburban Connecticut community who is suffering from a severe midlife crisis, yearning for the fast-paced life she had with her ex-boyfriend Brad. It is later revealed that her maiden name is Mann. She ends up with the happily ever after life that every woman dreams of but questions if that is really what happiness means. 
 Mike Vogel as Cooper Connelly, Billie's strait-laced husband who is an investment banker. He is a good guy kind of character, supportive no matter what. 
 Adam Demos as Brad Simon, Billie's well-endowed ex-boyfriend who is in her life again and trying to win her back despite the fact that Billie is married with children. He is a famous music producer and CEO of a record label he founded.
 Margaret Odette as Sasha Snow, Billie's best friend who is a psychology professor and living the single life. She tries to convince Billie that a good wife life is all she needs to be happy.
 Cleo Anthony as Kam (season 2), Sasha's ex-fiancé from 17 years ago who now a medical doctor that runs an international medical non-profit known as First Do No Harm
 Darius Homayoun as Majid (season 2), Billie's new love interest who owns a restaurant

Recurring

 Jonathan Sadowski as Devon, Cooper's colleague and friend who is a swinger
 Meghan Heffern as Caroline, another fake happy mom from the suburbs
 Amber Goldfarb as Trina, Devon's wife who is also a swinger and not happy about her married life
 Hannah Galway as Emily, Cooper's ex-girlfriend before his marriage to Billie
 Li Jun Li as Francesca, Cooper's boss who has feelings for Cooper and a successful businesswoman who knows what she wants
 Wallis Day as Gigi (season 2), Brad's new girlfriend who is pregnant with their baby
 Dylan Bruce as Spencer (season 2), Cooper's older openly gay brother who is a divorce lawyer
 Craig Bierko as Mick (season 2), Sasha's agent who is helping Sasha taking her career to the next level

Episodes

Series overview

Season 1 (2021)

Season 2 (2023)

Production

Development
On August 19, 2019, it was announced that Netflix had given the production a series order for a first season consisting of eight episodes. The series was created by Stacy Rukeyser who was also expected to executive produce alongside J. Miles Dale. On September 27, 2021, Netflix renewed the series for a second season.

Casting
On January 30, 2020, it was announced that Sarah Shahi was cast to headline the series. On March 5, 2020, it was reported that Mike Vogel, Adam Demos, and Margaret Odette were cast in starring roles. On February 28, 2022, Wallis Day, Dylan Bruce, Craig Bierko, Cleo Anthony, and Darius Homayoun joined the cast in recurring roles for the second season.

Filming
Principal photography for the series was originally scheduled to begin in Spring 2020, but was later postponed due to the COVID-19 pandemic. Filming for the first season began on August 31, 2020 and ended on December 9, 2020 in Mississauga, Ontario, Canada. Filming for the second season began on February 7, 2022 and concluded on May 6, 2022 in Toronto, Ontario, Canada.

Release
The first season of Sex/Life was released on June 25, 2021.
The second season premiered on March 2, 2023.

Reception
The review aggregator website Rotten Tomatoes reports a 21% approval rating with an average rating of 5.5/10, based on 24 critic reviews. The website's critical consensus reads, "Suffocating its more provocative ideas with steamy interludes and melodramatic writing, this erotic drama is too obsessed with sex to ever fully come to life." Metacritic, which uses a weighted average, assigned a score of 45 out of 100 based on 11 critics, indicating "mixed or average reviews".

On September 27, 2021, it was reported that the first season of Sex/Life was watched by 67 million households in its first four weeks following its release on June 25.

References

External links
 
 
 
 

2020s American drama television series
2021 American television series debuts
English-language Netflix original programming
Television series about marriage
Television shows set in Connecticut
Television shows filmed in Ontario
Television productions postponed due to the COVID-19 pandemic
Television shows based on American novels
Midlife crisis in television